is a former Japanese football player.

Playing career
Kubota was born in Hyogo Prefecture on July 24, 1976. After graduating from high school, he joined Yokohama Marinos in 1995. He played as defensive midfielder and center back. On March 18, he debuted against Kashima Antlers in opening match in 1995 season. However he could hardly play in the match after the debut. He could not play at all in the match in 1997 and he moved to Vissel Kobe in 1998. Although he played many matches as defensive midfielder, he retired end of 1998 season.

Club statistics

References

External links

1976 births
Living people
Association football people from Hyōgo Prefecture
Japanese footballers
J1 League players
Yokohama F. Marinos players
Vissel Kobe players
Association football midfielders